Lismore, an electoral district of the Legislative Assembly in the Australian state of New South Wales, has had three incarnations, the first from 1894 to 1904, the second from 1913 to 1920 and the third from 1927 until the present.


Members for Lismore

Election results

Elections in the 2010s

2019

2015

2011

Elections in the 2000s

2007

2003

Elections in the 1990s

1999

1995

1991

Elections in the 1980s

1988

1984

1981

Elections in the 1970s

1978

1976

1973

1971

Elections in the 1960s

1968

1965

1962

Elections in the 1950s

1959 by-election

1959

1956

1953

1950

Elections in the 1940s

1947

1944

1941

Elections in the 1930s

1938

1935

1933 by-election

1932

1930

Elections in the 1920s

1927

1920 - 1927

Elections in the 1910s

1917

1913

1904 - 1913

Elections in the 1900s

1901

Elections in the 1890s

1898

1895

1894

Notes

References

New South Wales state electoral results by district